The CEAFL championships was an Australian rules football tournament held between European nations where the sport of Australian Rules football is in the early stages of development.

History
The first CEAFL Championships were held in Madrid in 2003.

The second CEAFL Championships were held in Düsseldorf in 2004. The 2004 competition was won by Belgium (represented by the Brussels Saints), defeating Spain (represented by the Madrid Bears) in the final.  Other competing sides in that year included France (although this side consisted of only one French player and two Australians from the Paris Cockerels, combined with extra players from other countries), Austria, Germany (represented by club players from Düsseldorf and elsewhere).

The 2005 CEAFL Championships were to be held in Paris, France - but involvement first with the International Australian Football Council and then with the new organisation Aussie Rules International saw the event renamed the EU Cup.  This event was moved to London for organisational reasons and was held on October the 9th.

The 2006 EU Cup was to be held in Paris, but when organisers cancelled the event, the CEAFL championships were instead arranged to be hosted in Prague by the Czech Lions.

The 2007 CEAFL Championships was hosted by the Vienna Kangaroos in Vienna. Finland won the championship second year in a row, defeating the host Austria in the final.

Due to financial difficulties, since 2008 the event is currently on indefinite hiatus.

See also

References

External links

Australian rules football
Australian rules football competitions in Europe
International Australian rules football tournaments